Euclasta  is a genus of Asian, African, and Neotropical plants in the grass family.

Species
Species include:
 Euclasta clarkei (Hack.) Cope — native to Oman, India, Myanmar
 Euclasta condylotricha (Hochst. ex Steud.) Stapf — native to Africa (from Senegal to Zimbabwe, and in Madagascar and Comoros); South Asia in India; North America, Central America, and South America (from Sinaloa in northwest México to Goiás in Brazil).

References

External links

Andropogoneae
Poaceae genera